Hai Tien may refer to:

 Hai Tien, the protagonist of the 1972 Hong Kong film Game of Death, played by Bruce Lee
 Chinese cruiser Hai Tien, a protected cruiser in the Chinese fleet